Samur is a village and municipality in the Qusar Rayon of Azerbaijan.  It has a population of 2,388 and is named after the river which forms part of the Azerbaijan–Russia border. Samur is itself the nearest village to the SDK border crossing where the M1 highway crosses into Russia. This border crossing is the only legal road crossing between the two nations though there is also a railway crossing at Yalama. Both are open to CIS citizens only.

References 

Populated places in Qusar District